The 1990 PGA Tour season was played from January 4 to October 28. The season consisted of 44 official money events. Wayne Levi won the most tournaments, four, and there were 10 first-time winners. The tournament results, leaders, and award winners are listed below.

Schedule
The following table lists official events during the 1990 season.

Unofficial events
The following events were sanctioned by the PGA Tour, but did not carry official money, nor were wins official.

Money leaders
The money list was based on prize money won during the season, calculated in U.S. dollars.

Awards

Notes

References

External links
PGA Tour official site

PGA Tour seasons
PGA Tour